Katerina Stewart was the defending champion, having won the previous edition 2015, but chose not to participate.

Barbora Krejčíková won the title, defeating Nicole Gibbs in the final, 6–0, 6–1.

Seeds

Draw

Finals

Top half

Bottom half

References

Main Draw

Innisbrook Open - Singles